Kallamanaickenpatti is a panchayat town in Virudhunagar district in the Indian state of Tamil Nadu.

Facilities 
Government Higher Secondary school, Government Hospital, Cooperative Bank, Post Office, TNEB Office, E-Seva center, Govt primary school, Anganwadi. Nearest Police Station is in Alangulam

Politics
Assembly Constituency  : Sattur (Assembly constituency)

Loksabha Constituency  : Virudhunagar

Adjacent communities

Reference 

Villages in Virudhunagar district